Selaginella willdenowii is a species of vascular plant in the Selaginellaceae family. It is a spikemoss known by the common names Willdenow's spikemoss and peacock fern due to its iridescent blue leaves. Like other Selaginallales, it is fern ally and not a true fern.

Selaginella willdenowii is sometimes spelt incorrectly as Selaginella willdenovii.

Description
The blue iridescence is produced by thin-film interference produced by a thin layer of cells with lamellar structure in the upper cuticle of leaves. It is suggested that this adaptation reduces the effect of strong sun beams filtering through the canopy that would otherwise damage shade-adapted species. Blue iridescence is found also Selaginella uncinata and both species are adapted for extreme shade below the forest canopy.

References

External links

 Glow-in-the-light ferns by Daniela Rambaldini; 19 May 2011

willdenowii
Flora of Asia
Taxa named by John Gilbert Baker